The North American Association of Sports Economists (NAASE) is an organization that promotes and facilitates research and teaching in the economics of sports. NAASE was founded in 2007.  The organization emerged from the many sessions focused on sports economics at the Western Economic Association International (WEAI) meetings held throughout the 1990s and early 2000s.  NAASE maintains a close relationship to the WEAI and the annual NAASE business meeting takes place at this conference.  Although many NAASE members are academics, membership is open to anyone with an interest in sports economics, and NAASE counts undergraduate and graduate students in economics and other related disciplines like sport management as members, as well as non-economists with an interest in sports economics.  Despite the regional scope implied by its name, NAASE has members from around the world, and many past and current officers have been from outside North America. NAASE currently has around 100 members.

Journals
The Journal of Sports Economics has been published in association with NAASE since 2008, and NAASE members receive discounted subscriptions to the journal.  Beginning in February 2009, the Journal of Sports Economics began publishing an annual volume dedicated to papers from NAASE sponsored sessions at the Western Economic Association annual conference.

Officers

 President: Craig Depken II, UNC Charlotte
 Past-President: Victor Matheson, College of the Holy Cross
 President-Elect: , 
 Secretary: Jane Ruseski, West Virginia University
 Treasurer: John Solow, University of Central Florida

Activities
NAASE sponsors sessions at numerous academic conferences, including the Western Economic Association International conference, the Southern Economic Association conference and the Eastern Economic Association conference.  NAASE also sponsors a listserv to promote interaction among researchers in sports economics.

NAASE, in conjunction with the International Association of Sports Economists, operates a working paper series that is part of Research Papers in Economics (Repec).

Awards
NAASE confers an award every four years, the Larry Hadley Service Award, to recognize outstanding service to the field of sports economics.  The first Larry Hadley Service Award will be given at the WEAI Annual Conference in Portland, Oregon in July 2010.

References

External links
 North American Association of Sports Economists
 Journal of Sports Economics
 Western Economic Association International

Professional associations based in the United States
Management, Sport
Economics societies
International economic organizations